Lucie Paus Falck (born 8 May 1938) is a Norwegian politician for the Labour Party.

She served as a deputy representative to the Norwegian Parliament from Akershus during the term 1989–1993. From 1988 to 1989, during the second cabinet Brundtland, Paus Falck was appointed State Secretary of the Ministry of Local Government and Labour.

On the local level Paus Falck was the mayor of Enebakk from 1984 to 1987.

Lucie Paus Falck is the daughter of noted Freemason Bernhard Paus and noted Franciscan Brita Collett Paus.

References

1938 births
Living people
Norwegian people of English descent
Collett family
Deputy members of the Storting
Labour Party (Norway) politicians
Mayors of places in Akershus
Norwegian state secretaries
Lucie
Women mayors of places in Norway
Place of birth missing (living people)
20th-century Norwegian women politicians
20th-century Norwegian politicians
Women members of the Storting
Norwegian women state secretaries